Joseph Luke Fryer (born 14 November 1995) is a retired English professional footballer who most recently played for Swindon Town as a goalkeeper.

Career
Fryer began his career with Middlesbrough at U-15 level.

On 26 January 2017, Fryer moved on loan to Hartlepool United. He would make his league debut in a 3–0 defeat at Luton Town on 14 February 2017, going on to make a further 13 appearances and keeping 2 clean sheets for the League Two outfit that season.

On 30 June 2017, Middlesbrough announced that Fryer would be joining League Two side Stevenage on loan for the 2017–18 season. He would make his league debut for Stevenage in a 3–3 draw with Newport County, going on to make 32 appearances in all competitions and keeping 6 clean sheets.

On 28 June 2018, Fryer headed out on loan to League Two side Carlisle United for the 2018–19 season.
In a game against Crewe whilst on loan Joe suffered a double leg break which would lead him to be initially hospitalized. His loan spell was ended.

On 10 September 2020, Fryer joined Swindon Town on a short term deal until January 2021 following a successful trial  On 7 January 2021, Swindon Town confirmed that Fryer would not be offered a contract extension and that he had left the club.

On 24 November 2022, Middlesbrough announced that Fryer had rejoined the club as an Academy goalkeeping coach following his retirement as a player.

Career statistics

References

External links

1995 births
Living people
English footballers
Association football goalkeepers
Middlesbrough F.C. players
Hartlepool United F.C. players
Stevenage F.C. players
Carlisle United F.C. players
Swindon Town F.C. players
English Football League players